Haruyoshi (written: 治好 or 晴良) is a masculine Japanese given name. Notable people with the name include:

, Japanese daimyō
, Japanese kugyō

Japanese masculine given names